Newbridge Town are a Senior Division Leinster Senior League side. A group of boys had decided they wanted to form a soccer team and approached Joe Barry and Tony Hannigan, both of whom had organised and played soccer for many years. Newbridge Town was founded in 1969 following a meeting in the old supper room of Newbridge Town Hall.

History 
In the club's first ever season in which they had entered the Counties League Division, Newbridge Town finished 4th and in the same season won the Counties Cup. In the following seasons the club gained further success, winning Division 2 and gaining promotion to Division 1, quickly winning that League and moving into the Leinster Junior League where they played well known clubs including Cherry Orchard, Home Farm, and Wayside Celtic. Newbridge town moved relentlessly through the grades and into the Leinster Senior League winning the Senior Division in the 1998/99 season.

Off the pitch the Newbridge Town had developed a Youth Project involved in the development of talented young players. Youth Teams were introduced to cater for the huge increase in interested potential young players. 2nd and 3rd teams were also formed in order to cater for the huge interest in soccer witnessed in the town in the club's maiden year. In 1973, the club Committee headed by Joe Carey, Joe Barry and Tony Hannigan invited Wacker München from (Germany) to play against Newbridge Boys. Two matches were played and both games drew crowds in excess of 2,000 to Ryan's field for each game. Both matches ended in draws. At the same time, Tom Shaw was selected for Irish Youth team becoming Newbridge Towns first international. He was quickly followed by goalkeeper Alan Gough. In the early 1980s the club bought land beside the railway station in Newbridge town and named it Station Road, playing their league games there.

In 2002 Newbridge Town were invited to join the Eircom League. However, it was decided to invite all interested football bodies to a formation meeting for a team that all of Kildare could support. It was decided to take this giant step under the name of Kildare County.

Over the years Newbridge Town has developed its facilities at Station Road and now contain a sports hall, a clubhouse, a 250-seat stand, training facilities, new all-weather pitches, showers and dressing rooms. The club has also increased in the number of teams it fields and now includes two ladies teams and 10 schoolboy teams ranging from the Under-9 to Under-16 age groups. It has recently installed a new 550 seat stand.

People of note 

Alan Gough

Alan was Newbridge Towns second ever player to receive an international honour. Alan is a former Republic of Ireland youth and Under-21 international, gaining five caps in the early 1990s. He moved to Portsmouth as an apprentice before signing for Fulham and then moved home to Ireland signing for Galway United in 1992. Alan won the First Division league title with Galway United in the 1992–1993 season. He spent 18 months with Galway United before moving to Shelbourne in 1994. He won the FAI Cup with Shelbourne in 1996 and 1997 and a runners-up medal in 1995 and 1998 as well as a League Cup winners medal in 1996 and a runners-up medal in 1998.

Alan moved to Glentoran in 1999 and had an excellent first season, winning the league Irish Cup and Irish League Cup. He moved to Derry City in 2002 claiming a personality clash with then Glentoran manager Roy Coyle leading to his decision to leave. Gough claimed he was earning less money playing for Derry than Glentoran and that his move was not a money issue.

Alan resigned for Galway United from Derry City in 2004. In 2006 he was appointed Galway United's first team captain for the 2006 season. Despite Galway United finishing third the club was promoted to the Premier Division due to the FAI takeover. Alan Gough announced at the end of the 2006 season that he was retiring from football.

Joe Barry, Tony Hannigan and Joe Carey

Joe Barry, Tony Hannigan and Joe Carey were involved in setting up the meeting resulting in the formation of Newbridge Town in 1969. They were members of the club committee who successfully brought over Wacker München from (Germany) to play against Newbridge Boys in 1973.

Jimmy Dowling

Former player, secretary and chairman of Newbridge Town. He is currently the treasurer of Newbridge Town. Jimmy Dowling was responsible for the formation of the League of Ireland team, Kildare County.

Honours
Leinster Senior League: 1
1998–99

References

External links 
 Newbridge Town FC – official website
 Leinster Senior League
 Galway United and Alan Gough
 Kildare County F.C.

Association football clubs established in 1969
Leinster Senior League (association football) clubs
Association football clubs in County Kildare
1969 establishments in Ireland
Kildare County F.C.